Pengiran Anak Damit binti Abdul Rahman (1924 – 13 September 1979) was the Queen consort of Brunei as the wife of the 28th Sultan of Brunei, Omar Ali Saifuddien III.

Early life 
Pengiran Anak Damit was born in 1924, in Brunei Town, Brunei. She is the oldest child of Pengiran Hajah Fatimah binti Radin Haji Hassan and Pengiran Bendahara Sri Maharaja Permasuara Pengiran Anak Abdul Rahman ibni Almarhum Pengiran Bendahara Pengiran Muda Omar Ali Junied. His father is Sultan Hashim Jalilul Alam Aqamaddin's grandson. In the palace, she received a private education.

Marriage 
Pengiran Anak Damit was married to her cousin, then Sultan Omar Ali Saiduddien III. The wedding ceremony for took place on 6 September 1941. On 6 June 1951, she was given the title Paduka Seri Baginda Raja Isteri following her husband's accession to the throne of Brunei. Pengiran Anak Damit became Paduka Seri Suri Begawan Raja Pengiran Anak Hajah Damit on 1 August 1968, following the abdication of her spouse in 1967. Pengiran Anak Damit and Omar Ali Saifuddien had ten children together (4 princes and 6 princesses);

 Sultan Hassanal Bolkiah
 Prince Mohamed Bolkiah
 Prince Sufri Bolkiah
 Prince Jefri Bolkiah
 Princess Masna Bolkiah
 Princess Norain Bolkiah
 Princess Umi Kalthum Al-Islam Bolkiah
 Princess Amal Rakiah Bolkiah
 Princess Amal Nasibah Bolkiah
 Princess Amal Jefriah Bolkiah
In 1972, Pengiran Anak Damit alongside her husband greeted the Duke of Edinburg at Istana Durul Hana, while he was on a visit to Brunei.

Death
On 13 September 1979, Pengiran Anak Damit passed away, aged 55 years old, in Bandar Seri Begawan's Kampong Sumbiling Lama at the Istana Darussalam. Her body was interred at the Kubah Makam Di Raja.

Legacy

Namesakes 
 Duli Raja Isteri Pengiran Anak Damit Mosque, a mosque in Mukim Kilanas, Bandar Seri Begawan.
 Raja Isteri Pengiran Anak Damit Secondary Arab School, a religious girl school, Parit, Bandar Seri Begawan.

Honours 

  Family Order of Laila Utama – Dato Laila Utama (31 May 1954)
  Omar Ali Saifuddin Coronation Medal – (31 May 1951)

References

1924 births
1979 deaths
Bruneian Muslims
Bruneian women
Bruneian royalty
Queens consort